Paul Galdone (June 2, 1907 – November 7, 1986) was an illustrator and writer known best for children's picture books.

Early life

He was born in Budapest and he emigrated to the United States in 1921. He studied art at the Art Student's League and New York School for Industrial Design. He served in the US Army during World War II.

Career and honors
He illustrated nearly all of Eve Titus' books, including Basil of Baker Street series which was translated to the screen in the animated Disney film, The Great Mouse Detective. Galdone and Titus were nominated for Caldecott Medals for Anatole (1957) and Anatole and the Cat (1958). The titles were later named Caldecott Honor books in 1971. He was posthumously awarded the 1996 Kerlan Award for his contribution to children's literature. His retellings of classic tales like The Little Red Hen or Three Billy Goats Gruff have become staples.

Death

On November 7, 1986 at aged 79, he died of a heart attack in Nyack, New York.

Selected works

References

External links

  

American children's writers
American children's book illustrators
Hungarian emigrants to the United States
1907 births
1986 deaths
United States Army personnel of World War II